The Chicago Maritime Festival is a maritime music and culture festival held in Chicago, United States, every winter, usually the last weekend in February, usually at the Chicago History Museum.  It is not uncommon for over 500 people to participate.  It has existed in its present incarnation since 2003 and is the only wintertime festival featuring maritime music in the United States.  The main organizers are performers Tom & Chris Kastle.

List of musical performers at Chicago Maritime Festival

2003

Kat yn 't Seil
Johnny Collins
John Conolly
97th Regimental String Band
Mlynn
Tom & Chris Kastle

2004

Don Sineti
Tom Lewis
Bob Zentz
The Johnson Girls
Tom & Chris Kastle
Lanialoha Lee
David H.B. Drake
Bounding Main
Sheridan Shore Chantey Singers
Old Town School of Folk Music Sea Music Class

2005

Pint & Dale
Serre l'Ecoute
Talitha MacKenzie
Lee Murdock
Tom & Chris Kastle
David H.B. Drake
Bounding Main
Sheridan Shore Chantey Singers
Friends Good Will Singers
Old Town School of Folk Music Sea Music Class

2006

(Held at the Latin School of Chicago due to remodeling at the History Museum)
The Boekaneirs
David H.B. Drake
John Townley
Nanne Kalma & Ankie van der Meer
Tom & Chris Kastle

2007

Bounding Main
Jerry Bryant
Johnny Collins
Philippe Duo (Philippe Noriel and Philippe Rouxel)
Tom & Chris Kastle

2008

Northern Neck Chantey Singers
Debra Cowan
Walter "Salty Walt" Askew
Holdstock & MacLeod
Tom & Chris Kastle

2009
Dan Milner
David Coffin
The Johnson Girls
Patrick Denain and Miguel Biard
Tom & Chris Kastle
Bounding Main
Old Town School of Folk Music Sea Music Class

2010

Caryl P. Weiss 
John Roberts
Rick Spencer
The 97th Regimental String Band
Tom and Chris Kastle
Old Town School of Folk Music Sea Music Class

2011

Bob Walser 
Cindy Kallet
Pint and Dale
Belize Culture and Heritage Association
Great Lakes Navy Band
Tom and Chris Kastle

See also

List of maritime music festivals
Maritime music

References

External links
 Chicago Maritime Festival official website

February events
Music festivals in Chicago
Maritime music festivals